José Javier Barkero Saludes (born 27 April 1979) is a Spanish former professional footballer. A left-footed attacking midfielder, he possessed a powerful long-range shot.

He amassed La Liga totals of 159 games and 30 goals over one full decade, representing in the competition Real Sociedad, Numancia and Levante. He added 233 matches and 43 goals in the Segunda División in eight seasons, with five clubs including the second.

Club career
Born in Aretxabaleta, Gipuzkoa, Barkero came from the youth system of Real Sociedad, playing one game with the first team in 1998–99. Over eight seasons he appeared sporadically for the Basque club (17 La Liga matches maximum, in 2005–06), and served loans at SD Eibar, Polideportivo Ejido and France's Toulouse FC.

For the 2006–07 campaign, Barkero joined Albacete Balompié in the Segunda División, where he remained two seasons as an undisputed starter. He scored 11 goals in his second year.

After CD Numancia achieved promotion to the top flight, Barkero moved to the team from Soria in July 2008. On 14 September he netted from a wonderful long-range strike in a 4–3 away defeat against Real Madrid, and added four more goals in the first 12 games. He finished his first season as the side's top scorer at 12, but they were eventually relegated as second-bottom.

Barkero scored 15 times for Numancia in the 2010–11 campaign, leading his team in that department in an eventual mid-table finish. Aged 32, he returned to the top division for 2011–12, agreeing to a two-year contract at Levante UD.

Barkero netted five league goals in his second season with the Valencians (seven overall). However, late into the campaign, he also accused teammates Sergio Ballesteros, Juanlu and Gustavo Munúa of lack of commitment during a 4–0 home loss to Deportivo de La Coruña, which led to several match fixing allegations.

In February 2015, after one year with Real Zaragoza in the second tier, 35-year-old Barkero decided to retire from football after not being able to find a new club.

International career
Barkero scored twice to help Spain win the 1999 FIFA World Youth Championship, including once in the 4–0 final rout of Japan.

Honours
Spain U20
FIFA World Youth Championship: 1999

References

External links

1979 births
Living people
People from Debagoiena
Spanish footballers
Footballers from the Basque Country (autonomous community)
Association football midfielders
La Liga players
Segunda División players
Segunda División B players
Tercera División players
Real Sociedad B footballers
Real Sociedad footballers
SD Eibar footballers
Polideportivo Ejido footballers
Albacete Balompié players
CD Numancia players
Levante UD footballers
Real Zaragoza players
Ligue 1 players
Toulouse FC players
Spain youth international footballers
Spain under-21 international footballers
Basque Country international footballers
Spanish expatriate footballers
Expatriate footballers in France
Spanish expatriate sportspeople in France
Spanish football managers